Ezequiel Eduardo Bullaude (born 26 October 2000) is an Argentine professional footballer who plays forward for Eredivisie club Feyenoord.

Career

Club
Bullaude got his senior career underway with Godoy Cruz in 2018, having previously played for their youth teams; in which time he had trials with Argentinos Juniors and Lanús. He was selected for his professional debut by manager Diego Dabove on 20 October, with the forward being substituted on for the final minutes of a 2–0 Argentine Primera División victory over Aldosivi at the Estadio Malvinas Argentinas.

On 30 August 2022, Bullaude signed a five-year contract with Feyenoord in the Netherlands. He made his debut for the club on 11 September 2022, coming on as a substitute during Feyenoord's 3–0 win over Sparta Rotterdam. He scored his first goal for the club on 9 March 2023, scoring the equalizer in a 1–1 draw away against Shakhtar Donetsk in the round of 16 of the Europa League.

International
In February 2018, Bullaude was selected by Pablo Aimar to train with the Argentina U19s.

Personal life
Bullaude's cousin, Carlos Matías Sandes, is a professional basketball player.

Career statistics
.

References

2000 births
Living people
Sportspeople from Mendoza, Argentina
Argentine footballers
Association football forwards
Godoy Cruz Antonio Tomba footballers
Feyenoord players
Argentine Primera División players
Argentine expatriate footballers
Expatriate footballers in the Netherlands
Argentine expatriate sportspeople in the Netherlands